Behind The Player: Fieldy is an interactive music video featuring Korn bassist Fieldy. Released on November 1, 2008 by IMV, the DVD features Fieldy giving in-depth bass lessons for how to play "Got The Life" and "Freak on a Leash" by Korn and an intimate behind-the scenes look at his life as a professional musician, including rare photos and video.  The DVD also includes Fieldy jamming the two tracks with Jane's Addiction drummer Stephen Perkins, VideoTab that shows exactly how Fieldy plays his parts in the two songs, as well as other bonus material.

IMV donates $.25 from the sale of each Behind the Player DVD to Little Kids Rock, an organization that gets instruments in the hands of underprivileged kids.

Contents
Behind The Player
Fieldy talks about his background, influences and gear, including rare photos and video

"Got The Life" by Korn
Lesson: Fieldy gives an in-depth bass lesson for how to play the song
Jam: Fieldy jams the track with Jane's Addiction drummer Stephen Perkins
VideoTab: Animated tablature shows exactly how Fieldy plays the track

"Freak on a Leash" by Korn
Lesson: Fieldy gives an in-depth bass lesson for how to play the song
Jam: Fieldy jams the track with Jane's Addiction drummer Stephen Perkins
VideoTab: Animated tablature shows exactly how Fieldy plays the track

Special features
Immanuel 123 promo video
Stillwell promo video
Photo Album
Little Kids Rock promotional video

Personnel

Produced By: Ken Mayer & Sean E Demott
Directed By: Leon Melas
Executive Producer: Rick Donaleshen
Associate Producer: Jamie Tiessere
Director Of Photography: Paulo Cascio
Sound Engineer: Matt Chidgey
Edited By: Jeff Morose
Mixed By: Matt Chidgey & Cedrick Courtois
Graphics By: Thayer DeMay
Transcription By: Thayer DeMay
Camera Operators: Brian Silva, Joe Hendrick, Doug Cragoe, Nate Lipp
Technical Directors: Tyler Bourns & Chris Golde

Gaffer: John Parker
Assistant Director: Matt Pick
Lighting And Grip: Mcnulty Nielson
Key Grip: Jaletta Kalman
Artist Hospitality: Sasha Mayer
Shot At: Third Encore
Special Guest: Stephen Perkins
Cover Photo By: Stephanie Pick
Video Courtesy Of: Sébastien Paquet, Danny “Hamcam” Hamilton
Photos Courtesy Of: Sébastien Paquet, Dina Arvizu, Marty Temme, Jacki Sallow, Tony Florez
Photo Library Complements Of: Ultimaterockpix.Com

References

External links
Official website

Behind the Player